All at Once may refer to:

 All at Once, a Japanese pop duo
 All at Once (The Airborne Toxic Event album), 2011
 All at Once (Screaming Females album), 2018
 "All at Once" (The Fray song), 2007
 "All at Once" (Whitney Houston song), 1985
 All at Once (2014 film), a Russian comedy film
 All at Once (2016 film), an American drama film